The Village Fête, La Kermesse or Noce de village. is a painting by Peter Paul Rubens, created in 1635–1638, now held in the Louvre Museum. It shows a 'kermesse' or village wedding.

References

External links
www.louvre.fr/en/oeuvre-notices/village-fete
http://cartelfr.louvre.fr/cartelfr/visite?srv=car_not_frame&idNotice=8189

Paintings in the Louvre by Dutch, Flemish and German artists
1638 paintings
Paintings by Peter Paul Rubens
Dogs in art